Robert "Bob" McCarron OAM (born July 1950 in London, England) is an Australian medic and special effects prosthetic makeup artist who has worked on many international movies and television shows. He is most recognisable from his on-screen appearances as "Medic Bob", in the UK series of I'm a Celebrity Get Me Out of Here! and as "Dr. Bob", in the German version, Ich bin ein Star – Holt mich hier raus!.

He was the medical supervisor for the opening and closing ceremonies of the Sydney 2000 Summer Olympics.

Ahead of the 22nd Series, of I'm a Celebrity...Get Me Out of Here!, it was announced that Bob would not be returning, as he was reportedly too busy with other work commitments, and will be replaced by another medic/doctor, while he is still present on the German version in 2023.

Personal life
In 2004, he was awarded the Order of Australia Medal (OAM) for services to the community and Australian stage and film and his work as a paramedic. Bob is also a wildlife enthusiast and holds a degree in wildlife biology.

Qualifications 
Although he is not a medical doctor, on screen he is often referred to as "Dr Bob", at least on Ich bin ein Star – Holt mich hier raus!. He is a pre-hospital care practitioner and intensive care paramedic with degrees in nursing, para-medicine, pre-hospital medicine, and certificates in other specialised medical areas.

Special effects prosthetic makeup 
Bob has been responsible for the special effects and prosthetic makeup on many international films and stage productions.

Some notable films for which he has done the prosthetic makeup include: The Matrix, Vertical Limit (2000), Queen of the Damned (2002) and The Piano (1993).

He designed the wild boar and the prosthetic makeup for the 1984 film Razorback.

Awards and nominations
McCarron has received shared awards and nominations for his film work.

References

Notes

External links 

 

Living people
1950 births
Australian make-up artists
Australian television personalities
Recipients of the Medal of the Order of Australia
I'm a Celebrity...Get Me Out of Here!
I'm a Celebrity...Get Me Out of Here! (British TV series)